Kine Beate Bjørnås (born 12 May 1980) is a Norwegian former cross-country skier who won gold at the 2005 .

Personal life
Bjørnås is from Meråker. As a youngster, Bjørnås travelled to Sør-Trøndelag for skiing, as there were too few competitive skiers in Nord-Trøndelag. There she became friends with Marit Bjørgen. She has a bachelor's degree in sports.

Career

Bjørnås joined the Norwegian junior team for the 2001–02 skiing season. Her best result that season was second in the 5 km classical event in Dombås. As a junior, she was described as "one of the most promising Norwegian skiers". She was promoted to the senior team for the 2003 season, but missed the entire season due to a cruciate ligament injury. In the 2003–04 season, her best result was second in the 10 km classical event in Bardufoss.

During the 2004–05 FIS Cross-Country World Cup, Bjørnås and fellow Norwegians Vibeke Skofterud, Hilde Gjermundshaug Pedersen, and Marit Bjørgen won the 4x5km relay race in Gällivare, Sweden. In the same season, the same four came third in the 4 × 5 km relay in Val di Fiemme, Italy. Bjørnås, Pedersen, Kristin Mürer Stemland, and Bjørgen also came second in the 4 × 5km relay in Falun, Sweden. She came 27th in the Women's sprint event at the FIS Nordic World Ski Championships 2005. Her best individual result at the FIS Cross-Country World Cup was seventh place in the 2006 15 km double staggered start race in Sapporo, Japan.

Bjørnås retired from the sport in 2008, choosing to become a skiing coach in Nord-Trøndelag. She has coached double Olympic champion Petter Northug. The Kinetest, a women's ski trail at the Grovatesten ski field in Meråker, is named after Bjørnås; the men's trail is slightly longer and is called the Frodetest after Frode Estil.

Cross-country skiing results
All results are sourced from the International Ski Federation (FIS).

World Championships

World Cup

Season standings

Team podiums

 1 victory – (1 ) 
 3 podiums – (3 )

References

1980 births
Living people
Norwegian female cross-country skiers
People from Meråker
Sportspeople from Trøndelag